Konami GX400 is an arcade system board by Konami that made its debut in 1985.

Nemesis specifications
Main CPU: Motorola 68000 @ 9.216 MHz
Sound CPU: Zilog Z80
Sound Chip: 2x AY-3-8910 PSG or YM2151, VLM5030 and K005289

List of Konami GX400 games
Black Panther (1987)
City Bomber (1987)
Galactic Warriors (1985)
Gradius (video game) (1985)
Hyper Crash (1987)
Konami GT (1985)
Nyan Nyan Panic (1988)
Salamander (1986)
TwinBee (1985)

See also
Bubble System

External links
Hardware and game information: GX400 at System 16: The Arcade Museum

Konami arcade system boards
68k-based arcade system boards